Volker Finke (born 24 March 1948) is a German football manager. He was the coach of SC Freiburg for 16 years.

Coaching career
On 6 December 2008, Japanese club Urawa Red Diamonds announced they signed a contract with Finke as head coach until 2010.

On 18 December 2010, Finke was named as the new director of sport by 1. FC Köln effective on 1 February 2011. Effective on 27 April 2011, Finke additionally became interim coach until the end of the season. On 10 March 2012, Köln parted company with Finke by mutual consent after a 1–0 win over Hertha BSC.

On 22 May 2013, he was named as head coach of Cameroon. He was sacked on 30 October 2015, two weeks before the 2018 FIFA World Cup qualification phase started.

Honours

Manager
SC Freiburg
2. Bundesliga: 1992–93, 2002–03

See also
 List of longest managerial reigns in association football

References

External links

1948 births
Living people
People from Nienburg, Lower Saxony
Footballers from Lower Saxony
German footballers
German football managers
TSV Havelse managers
SC Freiburg managers
J1 League managers
Urawa Red Diamonds managers
1. FC Köln managers
Expatriate football managers in Japan
Bundesliga managers
2. Bundesliga managers
Cameroon national football team managers
2014 FIFA World Cup managers
2015 Africa Cup of Nations managers
Association football midfielders
TSV Havelse players
Hannoverscher SC players
Expatriate football managers in Cameroon
German expatriate sportspeople in Japan
German expatriate sportspeople in Cameroon
German expatriate football managers
West German footballers
West German football managers